The Memphis Showboats are a professional American football team based in Memphis, Tennessee. They are one of the eight members of the United States Football League (USFL) as a member of the South Division. The Showboats and Houston Gamblers will play home games at Simmons Bank Liberty Stadium for the 2023 USFL season.

History 
On November 15, 2022, it was announced that the Showboats were joining to fulfill the Tampa Bay Bandits spot after they announced their hiatus for the second season of the USFL. On that same day, Todd Haley was announced as their inaugural head coach. Players and coaches from the existing Bandits team were transferred to the Showboats.

Personnel

Roster

Staff

References

American football teams established in 2022
American football teams in Memphis, Tennessee
United States Football League (2022) teams
2020s establishments in Tennessee